Saint Winnoc (c. 640-c. 716/717) was an abbot or prior of Wormhout who came from Wales. Three lives of this saint are extant (BHL 8952-4).  The best of these, the first life, was written by a monk of St. Bertin in the middle of the ninth century, or perhaps a century earlier BHL.

St. Winnoc is generally called a Breton, but the Bollandist Charles De Smedt shows that he was more probably of Welsh origin.  He is said to have been of noble birth, of the same house as the kings of Domnonia.  Some sources state that Winnoc's father was Saint Judicael.  He may have been raised and educated in Brittany, since his family had fled there to escape the Saxons. He is said to have founded the church and parish of St Winnow in Cornwall, though this toponym may be connected with Saint Winwaloe.

Winnoc came to Flanders, to the Monastery of Saint-Omer, then ruled by St. Bertin, with three companions, and was soon afterwards sent to found at Wormhout, a dependent cell or priory (not an abbey, as it is generally called). It is not known what rule, Columbanian or Benedictine, was followed at this time in the two monasteries.

When enfeebled by old age, St. Winnoc is said to have received supernatural assistance in the task of grinding grain for his brethren and the poor.  The mill ground the grain automatically due to the intercession of the saint's prayers. A monk who, out of curiosity, came to see how the old man did so much work, was struck blind, but healed by the saint's intercession. Many other miracles followed his death, which occurred 6 November 716 or 717 (we only know the year from fourteenth century tradition).

Veneration
The popularity of St. Winnoc's cultus is attested by the frequent insertion of his name in liturgical documents and the numerous translations of his relics. He was originally buried at Wormhout, but his relics were translated to Bergues-Saint-Winnoc in 899.  It is said that people who stood along the route taken by the monks were reported to have been healed of many illnesses, especially coughs and fevers.  His relics were invoked against drought. The monastery was burned by Protestants in 1558.  Some of Winnoc's relics were destroyed.

His feast is kept on 6 November, that of his translation on 18 September; a third, the Exaltation of St. Winnoc, was formerly kept on 20 February.

Notes

External links
Patron Saints: Winnoc
Winnoc at the Catholic Encyclopedia
 Winocus von Flandern der Schutzpatron der Müller

640 births
710s deaths
Medieval Breton saints
French abbots
8th-century Christian saints

Year of birth uncertain
Year of death uncertain